This is a list of all captains of the Brisbane Bears, an Australian rules football club in the Australian Football League.

References

History of the Brisbane Bears

Brisbane Bears
Brisbane Bears